The 1992–93 Belgian Cup was the 38th season of the main knockout competition in Belgian association football, the Belgian Cup.

Final rounds
For the first time, the final phase started in the round of 32 when all clubs from the first division entered the competition (18 clubs plus 14 clubs from the qualifications). All rounds were played in one leg except for the semifinals. The final game was played at the Constant Vanden Stock Stadium in Brussels and won by Standard Liège against Sporting Charleroi. on 6 june 1993

Bracket

* after extra time

References

Belgian Cup seasons
Cup